The 2022 Hamilton mayoral election took place on 8 October 2022 to determine the Mayor of Hamilton, New Zealand. For the first time, the election was held under the single transferable vote system. Incumbent mayor Paula Southgate was re-elected.

Candidates

Declared candidates
 Lee Bloor
 Lachlan Coleman
Jack Gielen, former deputy leader of The Republic of New Zealand Party and serial election candidate
 Horiana Henderson
 Riki Manarangi
Donna Pokere-Phillips, co-leader of the NZ Outdoors & Freedom Party
Paula Southgate, incumbent mayor
Geoff Taylor, deputy mayor

Declined to be candidates
Louise Hutt, 2019 mayoral candidate
Angela O'Leary, city councillor
Ewan Wilson, city councillor

Results

Aftermath
On 14 October 2022, Southgate named Angela O'Leary as deputy mayor.

References

Politics of Hamilton, New Zealand
Mayoral elections in New Zealand
Hamilton
October 2022 events in New Zealand